Sofia Nilsson is a Swedish name that may refer to:

 Sofia Nilsson (footballer) (born 1990), Swedish football midfielder
 Sofia Nilsson (politician) (born 1982), Swedish politician